Sydney John Chaplin (16 March 1885 – 16 April 1965) was an English actor. Chaplin was the elder half-brother of actor and filmmaker Charlie Chaplin and served as his business manager in later life.

Through their mother Hannah, they were older half-brothers to the younger Wheeler Dryden, who grew up separately with his father in England and was not told about his half-brothers until 1915. Dryden later emigrated to the United States, joining the Chaplins in Hollywood. Sydney Chaplin was also a half-uncle of actor Sydney Chaplin (1926–2009), who was named after him.

Early life 

Sydney John Hill was born in London to the unmarried 19-year-old Hannah Hill, who was a music hall entertainer. She claimed the boy's father was Sydney Hawkes, but his father's identity was never verified. Hannah was of Romanichal heritage. A year later, his mother married Charles Chaplin Sr., and the latter became his legal guardian. Sydney's surname was changed to Chaplin. Hannah and Charles had a son together called Charlie.

While Syd and half-brother Charlie were in the Cuckoo Schools in Hanwell following their mother's mental collapse, Syd was placed in the programme designed to train young boys to become seamen. He served on the Exmouth training ship docked at Grays, Essex. He followed this training period with several years working on ships, receiving high marks from all of his employers but his ambition was to get into the entertainment business like his parents and brother, and he left his final voyage with that in mind.

In 1905 Charlie and Sydney worked briefly together in one of their first stage appearances, Sherlock Holmes. Syd was briefly cast as a villain in that play. In 1906, however, he landed a contract with Fred Karno, of Karno's London Comedians, and worked hard to bring Charlie into the company two years later. Charlie never achieved the sort of fame Syd did as a principal comedian for that company, but surpassed him later as an actor, director and producer.

After Charlie achieved worldwide fame in 1915, the brothers were contacted by their half-brother Wheeler Dryden, whose father had just told him of the connection. His father had removed Wheeler from their mother as an infant and brought him up separately. Wheeler was also an actor, and the brothers reunited in Hollywood in 1918 after they all immigrated to the United States. They occasionally worked together at Charlie Chaplin's studio through to the 1950s.

Career

Keystone
As Charlie was negotiating his Keystone contract in Hollywood, he suggested Sydney be asked to join the company. Syd and his wife Minnie Chaplin arrived in California in October 1914. Syd made a few comedies there, including the "Gussle" comedies, and the comedy short A Submarine Pirate in 1915. Second to Tillie's Punctured Romance, this was the most financially successful comedy Keystone ever made.

Charlie's business affairs
Following this success, Sydney decided to leave the screen to negotiate Charlie a better contract. After getting him a $500,000 contract with Mutual on 27 February 1916, he got him his first million dollar ($1.25 million) contract on 17 June 1917 with First National Pictures. Soon he was handling the majority of Charlie's business affairs, in addition to further contract negotiation. Their sheet music business failed, but they were successful with a merchandising one.

Sydney also appeared in a few films during the First National era, such as Pay Day and The Pilgrim. Sydney achieved his own million-dollar contract from Famous Players-Lasky in 1919, but a series of problems resulted in his making only one, failed, film, King, Queen, Joker (1921). He disappeared from the screen once again.

Aviation 
During this period, Syd Chaplin's most important contribution may be in the field of aviation. In May 1919, he, along with pilot Emory Herman Rogers Jr., developed and launched the first privately owned domestic American airline, the Syd Chaplin Airline Company, based in Santa Monica, California. Although the corporation lasted only a year, in that time it established many "firsts." Syd and partners had the first airplane showroom for their Curtiss airplanes. It offered observation flights for $10 and round-trip flights to San Diego for $150.

On 4 July 1919, the Syd Chaplin Aircraft Corporation began flights to Santa Catalina Island.

Sydney Chaplin Aerodrome (Chaplin Airfield) was south of Wilshire and west of Crescent (now bounded by Wilshire Boulevard, Fairfax Avenue, and San Vincente Boulevard).

Emery H. Rogers conducted the first roundtrip Los Angeles to San Francisco flight in one 24-hour period. Charlie Chaplin took his first airplane flight in one of Syd's planes, as did many other notable figures of the period. Syd Chaplin got out of the aviation business after governments began to pass legislation regulating pilot licensing and the taxation of planes and flights.

Roger's Field
On December 29, 1920, Amelia Earhart was booked for a passenger flight, at the-now Emory Roger's Roger's Field which included Chaplin Airfield and DeMille Field No. 2. The cost was $10 for a 10 minute flight with Frank Hawks (later gaining fame as an air racer), giving her a ride that would forever change Earhart's life.

Return to acting 

He returned to acting, and later films include The Perfect Flapper (1924) with Colleen Moore, A Christie Comedy, and Charley's Aunt (1925). He made five features for Warner Bros. Pictures, including The Man on the Box (1925), Oh, What a Nurse! (1926), The Missing Link (1927), and The Fortune Hunter (1927).

Warner Brothers' The Better 'Ole (1926) is perhaps Syd's best-known film today because of his characterisation of Old Bill, adapted from a World War I character created by cartoonist Bruce Bairnsfather. Also, this was the second Warner Bros. film to have a Vitaphone soundtrack. This film is believed by many to have the first spoken word of dialogue in film, "coffee", although other historians disagree.

Syd Chaplin returned to England, where he made his first film for British International Pictures (BIP), A Little Bit of Fluff (1928). This proved to be his final film. In 1929, as he was to begin work on a second film for the studio, Mumming Birds, he was accused of sexual assault by actress Molly Wright. BIP settled out of court, which appeared to concede the truth of Wright's claims. Following the scandal, Chaplin left England again and moved to Europe, leaving a string of unpaid tax demands. By 1930 he was declared bankrupt.

Personal life and death

Chaplin married twice and had no children. He married his first wife, Minnie, in England before 1914. She was diagnosed with breast cancer and died in France in September 1936 following surgery for the illness. After World War II, Chaplin lived most of his final years in Europe. He married again, to Henriette (called Gypsy).

After a long illness, he died one month after his 80th birthday, on his half-brother Charlie's birthday, on 16 April 1965, in Nice, France. Gypsy survived him. Chaplin is buried in Clarens-Montreux Cemetery, near Vevey. After Gypsy died in 1992, she was buried beside him.

In popular culture 
Sydney Chaplin was portrayed both as a teenager by actor Nicholas Gatt and as an adult by actor Paul Rhys in Richard Attenborough's Chaplin. The film explored his personal and professional relationship with Charlie.

Selected filmography 
 His Prehistoric Past (1914) as Policeman 
 Gussle's Day of Rest (1915)
 A Dog's Life (1918)
 The Bond (1918)
 Shoulder Arms (1918)
 King, Queen, Joker (1921)
 Pay Day (1922)
 The Pilgrim (1923)
 The Rendezvous (1923)
 Her Temporary Husband (1923)
 The Galloping Fish (1924)
 The Perfect Flapper (1924)
 The Man on the Box (1925)
 Charley's Aunt (1925)
 The Better 'Ole (1926)
 Oh! What a Nurse! (1926)
 The Fortune Hunter (1927)
 The Missing Link (1927)
 A Little Bit of Fluff (1928)

Further reading

References

External links 

 Website dedicated to Sydney Chaplin by Lisa K. Stein
 Biography of Sydney Chaplin by Linda Wada
 
 Sydney Chaplin at Virtual History
Abandoned & Little-Known Airfields: Rogers Airport / Chaplin Airport by Paul Freeman

1885 births
1965 deaths
Male actors from London
Sydney
English male film actors
English male silent film actors
Music hall performers
Silent film directors
20th-century English male actors
English people of Irish descent
British expatriates in the United States
British people of Romani descent
Romani male actors
Romani film directors